The Bjørkasholmen Formation is a geologic formation in Norway. It preserves fossils dating back to the Ordovician period.

See also

 List of fossiliferous stratigraphic units in Norway

References
 

Geologic formations of Norway
Ordovician System of Europe
Ordovician Norway
Paleontology in Norway
Ordovician southern paleotemperate deposits